Equinae is a subfamily of the family Equidae, which have lived worldwide (except Indonesia and Australia) from the Hemingfordian stage of the Early Miocene (16 million years ago) onwards. They are thought to be a monophyletic grouping. Members of the subfamily are referred to as equines; the only extant equines are the horses, asses, and zebras of the genus Equus.

The subfamily contains two tribes, the Equini and the Hipparionini, as well as two unplaced genera, Merychippus and Scaphohippus.

Sister taxa
 Anchitheriinae
 Hyracotheriinae

References

Miocene horses
Pliocene odd-toed ungulates
Pleistocene horses
Equidae
Extant Miocene first appearances